Tin Hau is one of the 13 constituencies of the Wan Chai District Council of Hong Kong. The seat elects one member of the council every four years. It was first created in Hong Kong district board elections, 1994. The constituency boundary is loosely based on the Tin Hau and Lai Tak Tsuen with estimated population of 15,051. It was transferred to the Wan Chai District in the District Council election in 2015.

Councillors represented

Election results

2010s

2000s

1990s

Notes

References

Constituencies of Hong Kong
Constituencies of Eastern District Council
Constituencies of Wan Chai District Council
1994 establishments in Hong Kong
Constituencies established in 1994